Thomas Losse-Müller (born 3 April 1973) is a German politician. He is a member of the Social Democratic Party of Germany and Leader of his Party in the Landtag of Schleswig-Holstein.

Career 
Between 1992–1999, Losse-Müller studied Economics at the University of Cologne. He went on to study Development Economics at the School of Oriental and African Studies.

From 2000 to 2004, Losse-Müller was an Assistant Vice President at Deutsche Bank in London. In 2004, he began working as a Financial Economist for the World Bank, until he began working as a program director for the German Society for technical cooperation in 2008. In 2010, Losse-Müller went back to work at the World Bank as a Senior Financial Sector Expert.

Before joining the Social Democratic Party of Germany in 2020, Losse-Müller was a member of Alliance 90/The Greens. He was a board member of the Hesse Alliance 90/The Greens between 2009 and 2012 and spokesperson to the Committee on Economy and Finance for the Hesse Alliance 90/The Greens between 2011 and 2012.

In 2012, Losse-Müller became State Secretary to the Schleswig-Holstein Ministry of Finance upon being invited to Schleswig-Holstein by Monika Heinold. He went on to serve as Head of the State Chancellery of Schleswig-Holstein between 2014 and 2017.

Between 2017 and 2021 Losse-Müller worked at EY Parthenon, a Consulting firm based in Hamburg.

In Fall of 2020, Losse-Müller became a member of the Social Democratic Party of Germany. He was nominated lead candidate for the 2022 state election in Schleswig-Holstein in August 2021.

Losse-Müller was elected his Party's Leader in the Landtag of Schleswig-Holstein on 18 May 2022 and thus became Leader of the Opposition.

Personal life 
Losse-Müller was born as son to two teachers in Schwerte, North Rhine-Westphalia. He is married and has two daughters.

References 

1973 births
Living people
Schleswig-Holstein
21st-century German politicians
Social Democratic Party of Germany politicians